The Asian Athletics Championships is an event organized by the Asian Athletics Association.

History
The competition courted controversy with the IAAF when political in-fighting arose after Israel was excluded from participation in 1977. That edition of the competition was canceled, with championships between 1979 and 1989 being regarded by the IAAF as unofficial, called the "Asian Track and Field Meeting" as a result. This situation was resolved when Israel began competing in European Athletic Association events in 1990.

Editions 
  being regarded by the IAAF as unofficial, called the "Asian Track and Field Meeting" as a result.
  cancelled

Medals (1973–2019)
As of 2019 Asian Athletics Championships.

Championships records

See also
 Athletics at the Asian Games
 Asian Youth Athletics Championships
 Asian Juniors Athletics Championships
 Asian Masters Athletics Championships
 Asian Para Athletics Championships
 Asian University Athletics Championships

References

External links 
Asian Athletics Association
Past medallists from GBR Athletics

 
Athletics
Athletics
Recurring sporting events established in 1973
Continental athletics championships
Biennial athletics competitions